TopHat is an open-source bioinformatics tool for the throughput alignment of shotgun cDNA sequencing reads generated by transcriptomics technologies (e.g. RNA-Seq) using Bowtie first and then mapping to a reference genome to discover RNA splice sites de novo. TopHat aligns RNA-Seq reads to mammalian-sized genomes.

History 
TopHat was originally developed in 2009 by Cole Trapnell, Lior Pachter and Steven Salzberg at the Center for Bioinformatics and Computational Biology at the University of Maryland, College Park and at the Mathematics Department, UC Berkeley. TopHat2 was a collaborative effort of Daehwan Kim and Steven Salzberg, initially at the University of Maryland, College Park and later at the Center for Computational Biology at Johns Hopkins University. Kim re-wrote some of Trapnell's original TopHat code in C++ to make it much faster, and added many heuristics to improve its accuracy, in a collaboration with Cole Trapnell and others. Kim and Salzberg also developed TopHat-fusion which used transcriptome data to discover gene fusions in cancer tissues.

Uses 
TopHat is used to align reads from an RNA-Seq experiment.  It is a read-mapping algorithm and it aligns the reads to a reference genome. It is useful because it does not need to rely on known splice sites. TopHat can be used with the Tuxedo pipeline, and is frequently used with Bowtie.

Advantages/Disadvantages

Advantages 
When TopHat first came out, it was faster than previous systems. It mapped more than 2.2 million reads per CPU hour. That speed allowed the user to process and entire RNA-Seq experiment in less than a day, even on a standard desktop computer. Tophat uses Bowtie in the beginning to analyze the reads, but then does more to analyze the reads that span exon-exon junctions. If you are using TopHat for RNA-Seq data, you will get more read aligned against the reference genome.

Another advantage for TopHat is that it does not need to rely on known splice sites when aligning reads to a reference genome.

Disadvantages 
TopHat is in a low maintenance, low support stage, and contains software bugs that have spawned 3rd party post-processing software to correct. It has been superseded by HISAT2, which is more efficient and accurate and provides the same core functionality (spliced alignment of RNA-Seq reads).

See also 
Bowtie (sequence analysis)
List of RNA-Seq bioinformatics tools
Microarray analysis techniques
next generation sequencing
RNA-Seq

References

External links 
 TopHat page on Center for Computational Biology at JHU

Bioinformatics algorithms
Bioinformatics software
Laboratory software
Software using the Artistic license